Baba Balia (born in April 1954) is a spiritual guru and preacher from Odisha, India. He is a social reformer trying to eradicate superstitions, mobilising support to members of the vulnerable sections of society, opposing child marriage and supporting widow remarriage, providing relief to victims of natural calamities like floods and cyclones, and taking up several similar activities. 

The activities taken up by Baba Balia include:

Organizing dowry-free marriages of girls belonging to vulnerable sections of society
Campaigning for widows' right to live in dignity
Organising "Bratoponayan sanskar" (Sacred Thread Ceremony) of poor boys every  year
Advocating health check-up both bride and bride-groom before solemnization of marriage instead of matching of horoscopes
Creating awareness through public campaigns to take medical aid for recovery from snake bite instead of resorting to help from wizards
Organising rescue and relief operations during natural disasters like flood, cyclone and fire in inaccessible coastal area of Odisha
Advocating for protection of forests and conservation of bio-diversity
Working for the revival and popularization of "Lokanatya", "Pala" and "Sankirtan", the traditional cultural forms of folk dance and music

Recognition
In the year 2022, Govt of India conferred the Padma Shri award, the third highest award in the Padma series of awards, on Srimad Baba Balia for his distinguished service in the field of social work. The award is in recognition of his service as a "Social and Spiritual Leader from Jagatsinghapur working with Odisha's poor and backward communities".

Additional reading

Images of Baba Balia Ashram at Marjita, Odisha:

References

Spiritual teachers
Recipients of the Padma Shri in social work
Social workers
Social workers from Odisha
1954 births
Living people